Morteza Tabrizi (born 6 January 1991) is an Iranian professional footballer who played as a forward for Persian Gulf Pro League side Gol Gohar Sirjan.

Club career

Pas Hamedan
Tabrizi was part of Pas Academy since 2010. He promoted to the first team as summer 2013 with two years contract.

Zob Ahan
Morteza joined Zob Ahan in 2013 on a three-year contract. Tabrizi won the 2015 Hazfi Cup in his second season with Zob Ahan, he defended the title with Zob Ahan the following year and once again won the Hazfi Cup.
In the 2017–18 Persian Gulf Pro League, he became the second-best scorer with 13 goals.

Esteghlal
On 31 July 2018, Tabrizi officially signed for Esteghlal on a two-year contract. He was assigned the number 11 shirt at Esteghlal, the same number he used to wear at Zob Ahan.

Tabrizi made his debut for Esteghlal on 10 August 2018 in a 3–0 League victory over Tractor Sazi, scoring his first goal for the club within 28 minutes after a receiving a backheel pass from Farshid Esmaeili.

International career

Youth
He was regularly called up for the Iran U22 team by coach Alireza Mansourian in 2012 and 2013. On June 28, 2012, he scored two goals in a 7–0 victory against the Maldives U23 team.

Senior
Tabrizi was called up to the senior Iran squad by Carlos Queiroz for friendlies against Macedonia and Kyrgyzstan in June 2016.

Career statistics

Honours

Club
Zob Ahan
Hazfi Cup: 2014–15, 2015–16
Iranian Super Cup: 2016

Individual
Persian Gulf Pro League Team of the Year (1): 2017–18

References

External links
 Morteza Tabrizi On Instagram

1991 births
Living people
Iranian footballers
Persian Gulf Pro League players
Zob Ahan Esfahan F.C. players
Esteghlal F.C. players
People from Hamadan
Association football forwards